The Church of the Assumption, Howth is a Roman Catholic church in Howth, in Fingal in the historic County Dublin.

The church is situated at the junction of Thormanby Road and Main Street, Howth, with St. Mary's Road, a short road joining the other two roads, behind. The roof is double pitched slate with decorative terracotta ridge tiles and cast iron rainwater goods. The walls are rockfaced granite with a limestone plinth, gargoyles and early Irish stone crosses.

References

External links
 Official website
 Weekly parish newsletters
 Dublin Archdiocese website entry on Howth Parish

Howth
Churches of the Roman Catholic Archdiocese of Dublin